"The Power" is an episode of the CBS television anthology series Studio One consisting of an hour-long adaptation of Frank M. Robinson's 1956 science fiction novel The Power.  The episode was first broadcast June 4, 1956. Directed by William H. Brown Jr., it starred James Daly as Bill Tanner, Shepperd Strudwick as Navy liaison Commander Nordlund, and Theodore Bikel as physicist Karl Grossman.

See also
The Power (1968 film)

External links
 

Television episodes based on works
Studio One (American TV series)
1956 American television episodes
1956 television plays